Franz Wilhelm Langguth Erben GmbH & Co. KG is a German winery headquartered in Traben-Trarbach.  With annual production of about 50 million bottles and sales of about €108 million, Langguth is among the largest wine producers in the country.

The company was founded in 1789 by Franz Wilhelm Langguth.  Today it is best known internationally for its Blue Nun brand, and domestically for its Erben and Medinet brands.  It also produces the herbal liqueur Wurzelpeter under its Berliner Bärensiegel brand.

External links

Companies based in Rhineland-Palatinate
Wineries of Germany
Companies established in 1789
1789 establishments in the Holy Roman Empire